This is a list of documented and unconfirmed Sting jet occurrences.

List of sting jet cyclones

List of unconfirmed sting jets

References

Types of cyclone